Stoke Lyne is a village and civil parish about  north of Bicester, Oxfordshire in southern England.

Battle of Fethan leag
In AD 584 a Saxon army led by King Ceawlin of Wessex and his son Cutha fought an army of Britons "at the place which is named Fethan leag". Cutha was killed but his father Ceawlin won "many towns and countless war-loot". A 12th-century document records a wood called "Fethelée" in a reference to Stoke Lyne, so it is now thought the battlefield was probably near here.

Manor
Tostig Godwinson, Earl of Northumbria held the manor of Stoke Lyne before the Norman Conquest of England in 1066. When Tostig's elder brother Harold Godwinson was crowned King Harold II in January 1066, Earl Tostig encouraged Harald III of Norway to invade England, but in September Harold II defeated the Norwegian army at the Battle of Stamford Bridge and both Harald and Tostig were killed in the fighting.

The Domesday Book records that in 1086 Stoke Lyne's feudal overlord was Walter Giffard, who William II made 1st Earl of Buckingham in 1097. The manor remained part of the honour of Giffard until Walter Giffard, 2nd Earl of Buckingham died without an heir in 1164. It then passed to Richard de Clare, 2nd Earl of Pembroke, who was descended from a sister of the first Walter Giffard. It remained with his heirs until Anselm Marshal, 6th Earl of Pembroke died without a male heir in 1245. Anselm's estates were divided between five co-heiresses and Stoke Lyne passed to Richard de Clare, 5th Earl of Hertford and 2nd Earl of Gloucester, whose mother Isabel Marshal was a daughter of William Marshal, 1st Earl of Pembroke. Richard de Clare's grandson Gilbert de Clare, 7th Earl of Hertford was killed at the Battle of Bannockburn in 1314 leaving no male heir. His estates were divided between his three sisters but there is no mention of Stoke Lyne being among them.

Thereafter the Earls of Oxford held Stoke Lyne as part of their honour of Whitchurch until at least the 16th century.

Parish church
The Church of England parish church of Saint Peter has a late Norman nave and chancel. A north aisle was added in the 13th century and a south tower was added early in the 14th century. Most of the north aisle was demolished, leaving just the easternmost bay as a north transept. St. Peter's is a Grade II* listed building.

The tower has three bells, all cast by the Whitechapel Bell Foundry. Thomas II Mears cast the second bell in 1812, while Mears and Stainbank cast the treble in 1869 and the tenor in 1925.

The parish is now part of the benefice of Stratton Audley with Godington, Fringford with Hethe and Stoke Lyne. The benefice is part of the Shelswell group of parishes.

A Church of England school for the village was built in 1864 and reorganised as a junior school in 1930. It was still open in 1954 but has since closed.

Amenities
Stoke Lyne has a public house, the Peyton Arms, controlled by the Hook Norton Brewery. Stoke Lyne has a Women's Institute.

References

Sources

External links

Villages in Oxfordshire
Civil parishes in Oxfordshire